Haiyan is a town under the jurisdiction of Taishan, in Guangdong Province of southern China.

Haiyan contains an overseas Chinese farm (华侨农场).

External links
 Scenes of Haiyan Town
 Map of Haiyan Town

Taishan, Guangdong
Towns in Guangdong